Robert John Anderson (23 February 1936 – November 1996) was an English professional footballer who played in the Football League for Mansfield Town.

References

1936 births
1996 deaths
Footballers from Portsmouth
English footballers
Association football forwards
English Football League players
Halesowen Town F.C. players
Mansfield Town F.C. players
Telford United F.C. players